(English: Word of the year) is named by the Language Council of Norway, since 2012 in cooperation with the Norwegian School of Economics.

In addition, the language council mentions other notable words of the year; since 2012 it has listed ten words.

Background and methodology
The Language Council of Norway has named Årets ord since 2008. Since 2012, the language council has co-operated with word researcher Gisle Andersen at the Norwegian School of Economics.

The methodology is based on new words that the language council manually pick up in media during the year, evaluation of which new words appear most frequently in electronic media text bases and suggestions from the public. The word of the year does not need to be a completely new word, but must have had an increase in use and a special relevance during the year. The committee also evaluates the language quality, in particular whether the word (if of international origin) works well in Norwegian. In addition, the committee considers whether the word is likely to stay in use.

2008
 ('financial crisis') was named word of the year. The word was not new – between 1947 and 1988, the word was used on average one to four times yearly in Norwegian media according to the search engine Atekst/Retriever. Later the use of the word increased; in 1988, it was used 598 times and in 2007 it was used 218 times. In 2008, the word was used 10,732 times in newspapers, mainly after October.

2009
 ('swine influenza') was named word of the year. While the word had been used 17 times in Norwegian media until 23 April 2009, it was used more than 8,500 times during the rest of the year. ('pandemic') was another notable word of the year.

2010
 ('ash stuck') was named word of the year. The word refers to people who were unable to travel as planned because of the air travel disruption after the 2010 Eyjafjallajökull eruption.

2011
 ('rose march') was named word of the year. This referred to marches held in Oslo and other places in Norway following the 2011 terror attacks. ('jasmine revolution') also received mention.

2012
 (verb) (and the noun ) was named word of the year. The word refers to living on pension or welfare from the Norwegian Labour and Welfare Administration, a government agency called NAV in Norwegian. The word is primarily used for youth who stay out of work for some time. The word was in 2012 used among youth themselves, but also among commentators and politicians who expressed worry that young people were abusing the system and not trying hard enough to get a job or start studying. Critics of the choice claimed the word was derogatory and added to the stigmatisation of people who receive welfare benefits.

2013
 ('slow TV') was named word of the year. The word refers to a series of popular NRK live "marathon" coverage of events like rail trips and cruises, starting with Bergensbanen –  in 2009, continued with Hurtigruten –  and National Firewood Night as well as National Knitting Night in 2013. The high ratings for NRK's live broadcast from the World Chess Championship 2013 have also been seen as part of the slow-TV trend. The word and concept have been picked up internationally and it was named 2013 Best New Format by Television Business International.

2014
, meaning 'foreign fighter', was named word of the year. The choice reflected much focus in the Norwegian society on Norwegians who fight in the Syrian Civil war and related conflicts, mostly for ISIL. The word was used in Norwegian media for the first time in 2010 by terror expert Brynjar Lia who had gotten the word from fellow terror expert Thomas Hegghammer.

2015 
The word of the year was /, referring to economic changes in an environmentally friendly direction.

2016 
/ was chosen as the 2016 word of the year. Then-Prime Minister Erna Solberg popularized the term through using it in her annual New Year's speech. It refers to the work done by the public to help integrate refugees and immigrants into Norwegian society, showing that integration is not simply a governmental effort but also one undertaken by the average person.

2017 
The 2017 word of the year was  'fake news'. Its use became popularized after the 2016 United States presidential election.

References

Norway
Norwegian language
2008 establishments in Norway